Bonfire Heart is the lead single from British singer-songwriter James Blunt's fourth studio album, Moon Landing (2013). The song was written by Blunt and OneRepublic's lead singer Ryan Tedder, with whom Blunt had previously written the single "Stay the Night".

The song debuted at number six and climbed to number four in the UK Singles Chart.

Promotion
Blunt's record label sent out an email notifying Blunt's fans of the song's release, only to later discover they had inadvertently emailed their entire database. Blunt later took to Twitter to apologise for emailing "the whole of the UK by mistake". The email invited its recipients to visit Blunt's SoundCloud page, where the song could be streamed for free. The song had its first radio broadcast on BBC Radio 2 on 29 July, with a lyric video being uploaded to Blunt's YouTube page later that day.

On 7 October, Blunt performed the song live on the results show of the Australian X-Factor. 

On 5 November, Blunt performed the song live on The Ellen DeGeneres Show. 

On 28 February 2014, Blunt, after being interviewed, performed the song live on Skavlan.

Music Video
An accompanying music video directed by Vaughan Arnell was released on 28 August 2013.

The music video for Bonfire Heart was filmed in Eastern Idaho as well as Wyoming.

The portion of the music video shot in Idaho was filmed along U.S. Route 20 and Idaho State Highway 33 near Driggs, Idaho.

The portion of the music video shot in Wyoming was filmed along U.S. Route 191 and Wyoming Highway 22.
Some scenes were captured in the Grand Teton National Park near Moran, Wyoming

Track listing
Digital download - Single
Bonfire Heart (Blunt, Tedder)

CD Maxi Single/Digital download - EP
Bonfire Heart (Blunt, Tedder)
Miss America (Acoustic Version from Angel Studios) (Blunt, Steve Mac, Wayne Hector)
Next Time I'm Seventeen (Blunt, Matt Hales, Dan Wilson)
Heroes (Blunt, Guy Chambers)

Charts and certifications

Weekly charts

Year-end charts

Certifications

Personnel
Smith Carlson - Engineer

References

2013 songs
2013 singles
Songs written by James Blunt
James Blunt songs
Song recordings produced by Ryan Tedder
Songs written by Ryan Tedder
Atlantic Records singles
Number-one singles in Germany
Music videos directed by Vaughan Arnell